The Roman Catholic Diocese of Sonsón–Rionegro is a diocese located in the cities of Sonsón and Rionegro in the Ecclesiastical province of Medellín in Colombia.

History
 18 March 1957: Established as Diocese of Sonsón from the Metropolitan Archdiocese of Medellín
 20 April 1968: Renamed as Diocese of Sonsón – Rionegro

Special churches
Minor Basilica:
 Basílica de Nuestra Señora del Carmen, La Ceja

Bishops

Ordinaries
 Bishops of Sonsón
Alberto Uribe Urdaneta † (18 Mar 1957 – 13 Jul 1960) Appointed, Bishop of Cali
Alfredo Rubio Diaz † (12 Feb 1961 – 27 Mar 1968) Appointed, Archbishop of Nueva Pamplona
Bishops of Sonsón–Rionegro
Alfonso Uribe Jaramillo † (6 Apr 1968 – 16 Feb 1993) Retired
Flavio Calle Zapata (16 Feb 1993 – 10 Jan 2003) Appointed, Archbishop of Ibagué
Ricardo Antonio Tobón Restrepo (25 Apr 2003 – 16 Feb 2010) Appointed, Archbishop of Medellín
Fidel León Cadavid Marin (2 Feb 2011 – present)

Auxiliary bishop
Óscar Ángel Bernal (1986-1988), appointed Bishop of Girardota

Other priests of this diocese who became bishops
Ignacio José Gómez Aristizábal, appointed Bishop of Ocaña in 1972
Jairo Jaramillo Monsalve, appointed Bishop of Riohacha in 1988
Oscar Aníbal Salazar Gómez, appointed Auxiliary Bishop of Barranquilla in 1995
Ismael Rueda Sierra (priest here, 1981-1988), appointed Auxiliary Bishop of Cartagena in 2000
Guillermo Orozco Montoya, appointed Bishop of San José del Guaviare in 2006
Elkin Fernando Álvarez Botero, appointed Auxiliary Bishop of Medellín in 2012
Omar de Jesús Mejía Giraldo, appointed Bishop of Florencia in 2013
Carlos Alberto Correa Martínez, appointed Vicar Apostolic of Guapi in 2013
José Saúl Grisales Grisales, appointed Bishop of Ipiales in 2018

Gallery

See also
Roman Catholicism in Colombia

Sources

External links
 Catholic Hierarchy
 GCatholic.org
 Diocese website

Roman Catholic dioceses in Colombia
Roman Catholic Ecclesiastical Province of Medellín
Christian organizations established in 1957
Roman Catholic dioceses and prelatures established in the 20th century
Sonsón